Abrolophus mirabelae is a species of mite belonging to the family Erythraeidae. It belongs to the group of species that have comb-like setae.

References

Further reading
Makol, Joanna, and Andreas Wohltmann. "An annotated checklist of terrestrial Parasitengona (Actinotrichida: Prostigmata) of the world, excluding Trombiculidae and Walchiidae." Annales Zoologici. Vol. 62. No. 3. Museum and Institute of Zoology, Polish Academy of Sciences, 2012.
Haitlinger, Ryszard. "New records of mites (Acari: Prostigmata: Erythraeidae, Johnstonianidae, Microtrombidiidae, Tanaupodidae, Trombidiidae) from Austria, Hungary, Italy and San Marino." Zeszyty Naukowe Uniwersytetu Przyrodniczego we Wrocławiu, Biologia i Hodowla Zwierząt 55.559 (2007): 45-54.
EUROPY, Z. ZACHODNIEJ I. POLNOCNEJ. "FROM WEST AND NORTH EUROPE, WITH THE DESCRIPTION OF ABROLPH US N YMINDE GAB] C US SP. N. N OWE ZBIORY ROZTOCZY (A CARI: PROS T IGMATA."

Trombidiformes
Animals described in 2007
Arachnids of Europe